Hambone was a railway yard on the McCloud River Railroad in Siskiyou County, California, in the United States.

References

Sources 

 

Unincorporated communities in Siskiyou County, California
Unincorporated communities in California